Alfonso Castañeda, officially the Municipality of Alfonso Castañeda, is a 1st class municipality in the province of Nueva Vizcaya, Philippines. According to the 2020 census, it has a population of 8,539 people.

History
In the 1930s, the Bugkalots inhabited Lublub, then a sitio of Barangay Marikit. In 1950, it became an independent barangay of Pantabangan, Nueva Ecija. The people of Lublub headed by Barangay Captain Alfredo L. Castillo, Sr. requested Assemblyman Carlos Padilla to convert the barangay into an independent municipality of Nueva Vizcaya. Hence, Batas Pambansa No. 27, authored and sponsored by Assemblyman Padilla, was approved and signed by President Ferdinand E. Marcos on 20 April 1979. The Bill created the new town of Alfonso Castañeda, named after the first Governor of Nueva Vizcaya who belongs to a cultural minority.

Geography

Barangays
Alfonso Castañeda is politically subdivided into 6 barangays. These barangays are headed by elected officials: Barangay Captain, Barangay Council, whose members are called Barangay Councilors. All are elected every three years.

 Abuyo
 Galintuja
 Cawayan
 Lipuga
 Lublub (Poblacion)
 Pelaway

Climate

Demographics

Economy

Tourism
Alfonso Castañeda Municipal Hall
Alfonso Castañeda Town Plaza
Black Nazarene Parish Church of Alfonso Castañeda
Casecnan River
Mount Guiwan

Government
Alfonso Castañeda, belonging to the lone congressional district of the province of Nueva Vizcaya, is governed by a mayor designated as its local chief executive and by a municipal council as its legislative body in accordance with the Local Government Code. The mayor, vice mayor, and the councilors are elected directly by the people through an election which is being held every three years.

Elected officials

Education
The Schools Division of Nueva Vizcaya governs the town's public education system. The division office is a field office of the DepEd in Cagayan Valley region. The office governs the public and private elementary and public and private high schools throughout the municipality.

Gallery

References

External links

Official Website of Alfonso Castaneda
[ Philippine Standard Geographic Code]
Philippine Census Information
Local Governance Performance Management System

Municipalities of Nueva Vizcaya